Clarksburg may refer to the following places:

Canada
Clarksburg, Ontario, a community of The Blue Mountains, Ontario

United States of America
Clarksburg, California
Clarksburg AVA, an American Viticultural Area
Clarksburg, former name of Clarksville, California
Clarksburg, Indiana
Clarksburg, Kentucky in Lewis County along Kentucky Route 10
Clarksburg, Maryland 
Clarksburg, Massachusetts 
Clarksburg, Michigan 
Clarksburg, Missouri 
Clarksburg, New Jersey
Clarksburg, Ohio 
Clarksburg, Pennsylvania 
Clarksburg, Tennessee 
Clarksburg, West Virginia

See also
Clarkstown, New York
Clarksville (disambiguation)